Christopher J. Ireland is a United States Air Force brigadier general who serves as the Chief of Staff of the United States Air Forces in Europe – Air Forces Africa. He is to retire on October 1, 2021.

Prior to that, he was the Deputy Commander of the Canadian North American Aerospace Defense Region.

References

External links

Year of birth missing (living people)
Living people
Place of birth missing (living people)
United States Air Force generals
Date of birth missing (living people)